Snack Bar Budapest is a 1988 Italian neo-noir comedy film written and directed by Tinto Brass and starring Giancarlo Giannini. It is based on the novel with the same title by Marco Lodoli and Silvia Bre.

Plot
A disbarred lawyer (Giancarlo Giannini) is working as a debt collector for his partner Sapo (Philippe Léotard). Prostitute Milena (Raffaella Baracchi) impregnated by Sapo at an unnamed sea resort with a grotesque atmosphere (filmed in Lido di Ostia), he encounters the ambitious young ringleader Molecola (François Negret) who has bought several old recreational sites in the environs to turn the town into an "Italian Las Vegas", but the hotel-bar named "Snack Bar Budapest" run by a man (Carlo Monni) and his family remains an obstacle. Molecola needs a lawyer to legitimise the forceful eviction of Snack Bar Budapest and the lawyer agrees. However, a murder he commits brings him at odds with Molecola.

Cast 
 Giancarlo Giannini: the lawyer
 François Negret: Molecola
 Raffaella Baracchi: Milena
 Philippe Léotard: Sapo
 Carlo Monni: the hotel keeper
 Sylvie Orcier: Carla
 Giorgio Tirabassi: Papera 
 Valentine Demy: the prostitute
 Tinto Brass: the magistrate (cameo)

References

External links
 

1988 films
Italian neo-noir films
Films directed by Tinto Brass
Italian comedy films
1988 comedy films
1980s Italian-language films
1980s Italian films